The Young Learners Tests of English (YLTE) are a set of English language tests for learners in primary and middle grades. The tests are developed by CaMLA, a not-for-profit collaboration between the University of Michigan and the University of Cambridge.

The tests cover all four language skills: listening, reading, writing and speaking. They focus on American English and are available at three levels: Bronze (beginner), Silver and Gold (early intermediate).

Test format
The YLTE is a pen-and-paper test.

The Bronze, Silver and Gold tests all have three test sections:
 Listening
 Reading and writing
 Speaking

The printed test booklets use American English spellings and vocabulary. However, both British and American English are accepted in the student's written answers and in the speaking test.

Bronze

The YLTE Bronze test has the following test sections:

Silver

The YLTE Silver test has the following test sections:

Gold

The YLTE Gold test has the following test sections:

Scoring

There is no pass/fail score. All test takers receive a certificate, which has the following information:
 A score for each section of the test (maximum score of 5 medals per section)
 A total score (maximum score of 15 medals).

Students who achieve a total of 10 medals or more are ready to start preparing for the next level.

Usage

The YLTE are designed to be used as a way to prepare students for future English-language learning and help them develop their English skills, rather than as an institutional measurement device.

The YLTE is taken by students living in many different countries around the world, such as: Afghanistan, Albania,  Brazil, Canada, China, Costa Rica, Colombia,  Greece,  Italy,  Japan,  Jordan,  Malaysia,  Mexico (Ministry of Education), Peru,  Portugal, Romania, Serbia, Spain,  Ukraine,  Uruguay  and USA.

Preparation
Free practice tests, answer keys and student instructions are available on the official website, along with links to other practice materials.

See also
 CaMLA 
 CaMLA English Placement Test (EPT)
 Examination for the Certificate of Competency in English (ECCE) 
 Examination for the Certificate of Proficiency in English (ECPE) 
 MTELP Series 
 Michigan English Language Assessment Battery (MELAB) 
 Michigan English Test (MET) 
 Cambridge English Language Assessment 
 English as a Foreign or Second Language

References

External links
 Official website

ESOL
CaMLA assessments
English-language education
English as a second or foreign language
Standardized tests for English language